Brian Riemer (born September 22, 1978) is a Danish football coach who was appointed manager at Anderlecht on 2 December 2022, succeeding Robin Veldman who had been in place for six matches following the departure of Felice Mazzu.

Riemer joined Anderlecht after serving for four years as assistant coach at Brentford to Thomas Frank and had previously coached in his native Denmark, particularly at FC Copenhagen from 2009 to 2018.

The decision of then Copenhagen assistant coach Johan Lange to move with Ståle Solbakken to Wolves saw new FCK boss Ariël Jacobs promote Riemer from Under-19 coach to be his assistant for the senior team.

Together, Frank and Riemer helped Brentford to promotion from the EFL Championship in 2021, guiding the Bees to their first English top-flight campaign since 1946-47, with Reimer departing midway through Brentford's second season in the Premier League.

References

1978 births
Living people
Belgian football managers
R.S.C. Anderlecht managers
Belgian Pro League managers